See You Tomorrow is a 2013 Italian comedy film written and directed by Andrea Zaccariello.

Plot 
Marcello Santilli is looking for the opportunity of his life. All attempts to be successful at work and get rich have turned out to be failures and he is now bankrupt. His wife, who is tired of taking care of him like a mother, and his daughter do not value him and above all do not have confidence in his ability to achieve something good in his life. But he is not discouraged: he thinks he has found the opportunity to finally succeed in affirming himself. He discovers Petrafrisca, a small remote town in Puglia, where the population is made up mainly of residents over ninety years old, where there is no funeral home. He imagines that, given the average age of the inhabitants, there will be no shortage of potential "customers". He then launches into this new business and opens the agency. Unfortunately for him, the inhabitants of the village, despite his age, are all in excellent health and have no intention of becoming his "customers".

Cast 
   
Enrico Brignano as  Marcello Santilli
Burt Young as  Mario Palagonia
Francesca Inaudi as  Flavia
Ricky Tognazzi as Camicioli 
 Giulia Salerno  as Melania 
 Giorgia Würth  as Tina  
 Luca Avagliano as  Antonio Spataro

References

External links 

2013 comedy films
2013 films
Italian comedy films
2010s Italian films